GendBuntu is a version of Ubuntu adapted for use by France's National Gendarmerie. The Gendarmerie have pioneered the use of open source software on servers and personal computers since 2005 when it adopted the OpenOffice.org office suite, making the OpenDocument .odf format its nationwide standard.

Project 
The GendBuntu project derives from Microsoft's decision to end the development of Windows XP, and its inevitable replacement with Windows Vista or a later edition of Windows on government computers. This meant that the Gendarmerie would have incurred large expenses for staff retraining even if it had continued to use proprietary software.

One of the main aims of the GendBuntu project was for the organisation to become independent from proprietary software distributors and editors, and achieve significant savings in software costs (estimated to be around two million euros per year).

Around 90% of the 10,000 computers purchased by the Gendarmerie per year are bought without an operating system, and have GendBuntu installed by the Gendarmerie's technical department. This has become one of the major incentives of the scheme for staff; transferring to GendBuntu from a proprietary system means the staff member receives a new computer with a widescreen monitor.

The main goal is to migrate 80,000 computers by the end of 2014, a date which coincides with the end of support for Microsoft Windows XP. 35,000 GendBuntu desktops and laptops have been deployed as of November 2011.

A major technical problem encountered during the development of the project was keeping the existing computer system online while the update took place, not only in metropolitan France but also in overseas Departments and Regions. It was solved partly by redistributing dedicated servers or workstations on Local Area Networks (depending on the number of employees working on each LAN) and with the use of an ITIL-compliant qualifying process.

An IT Support team helped to implement the changes. This included the "core team" at Gendarmerie headquarters at Issy-les-Moulineaux and the "running team" of four located at the Gendarmerie data center at Rosny-sous-Bois.

Timeline 
 2004 - OpenOffice.org software replaces 20,000 copies of the Microsoft Office suite on Gendarmerie computers, with the transfer of all 90,000 office suites being completed in 2005. 
 2006 - Migration begins to the Mozilla Firefox web browser, on 70,000 workstations, and to the Mozilla Thunderbird email client. The Gendarmerie follows the example of the Ministry of Culture in this decision. Other software follows, such as GIMP.
 2008 - The decision is made to migrate to Ubuntu on 90% of the Gendarmerie's computers by 2016. Ubuntu is installed on 5,000 workstations installed all over the country (one on each police station's LAN), primarily for training purposes.
 2009 - Nagios supervision begins
 2010 - 20,000 computers ordered without a pre-installed operating system
 January 2011 - Beginning of the large scale phasing in of GendBuntu 10.04 LTS
 December 2011 - 25,000 computers deployed with GendBuntu 10.04 LTS
 February 2013 - Upgrade from GendBuntu 10.04 LTS to GendBuntu 12.04 LTS. The local management and IT support teams will phase in the upgrade in such a way to not disrupt the running of the police stations.
 May 2013 - Target for end of the migration to GendBuntu 12.04 LTS - 35,000 computers upgraded.
 December 2013 - 43,000 computers deployed with GendBuntu 12.04 LTS. TCO lowered by 40%.
 February 2014 - Beginning of final stage of the migration of existing Windows XP computers to GendBuntu 12.04 LTS
 June 2014 - Migration completed. 65,000 computers deployed with GendBuntu 12.04 LTS (total number of computers : 77,000)
 March 2017 - Migration completed. 70,000 computers deployed with GendBuntu 14.04 LTS (total number of computers: 82,000)
 May 2017 - Introduction of GendBuntu 16.04 LTS
 June 2018 - 82% of PC workstations running GendBuntu 16.04 LTS
 Early June 2019 - 90% of workstations running GendBuntu (approx. 77,000)
 Spring 2019 - Migration to GendBuntu 18.04

See also 
 Canaima (operating system)
 Inspur
 LiMux
 Nova (operating system)
 Ubuntu Kylin
 VIT, C.A.

References

External links 
 
 Presentation of Major Stéphane Dumond, French Gendarmerie Nationale, published December 26th, 2014
 French police: we saved millions of euros by adopting Ubuntu, Ars Technica, March 12, 2009

Linux software projects
State-sponsored Linux distributions
Ubuntu derivatives
Law enforcement in France
Linux distributions